The nerve to tensor veli palatini is a small nerve which is unique in that it is the only branch of the mandibular nerve providing motor innervation to the palate.

Mandibular nerve